Singam 123 is a 2015 Indian Telugu-language action comedy film directed by Akshat Ajay Sharma and is written and produced by Manchu Vishnu under his production banner 24 Frames Factory. The film stars Sampoornesh Babu in the lead role. The film released on 5 June 2015 to mixed reviews but was a box-office hit. The film has been released by 24 Frames Factory officially for home viewing. The film is a parody of the Singam series.

Plot
Set in the backdrop of a village called Singarayakonda which is ruled by a self-proclaimed king and mafia-lord, Lingam. He fancies himself as the destructive force and an archenemy of Law and Order. After several failed attempts by Indian Police throughout the decade, Singham123 is assigned the mission impossible - to arrest Lingam. Will Singham 123 be successful in completing the mission?

Cast
 Sampoornesh Babu as Singam 123
 Sanam Shetty as Chandni
 Annapoorna as Annapoorna
 Bhavani as Lingam
 Prudhviraj as Jaggam, Singam 123's father
 Viva Harsha as Junior Lingam (S/O Lingam)

References

External links

2010s Telugu-language films
2015 action comedy films
Indian action comedy films
2015 comedy films